Ride the Rhythm is the only album released on Wild Pitch Records by hip hop artist Chill Rob G. It contains four popular singles that are still regarded as classic hip hop by many, such as; "Let Me Show You", "Court Is Now in Session", "Let the Words Flow", and "The Power". In 1998, the album was selected as one of The Source's 100 Best Rap Albums.

Track listing

Samples
Court Is Now in Session
"The Jam" by Graham Central Station
"Soul Power '74" by Maceo & the Macks
Motivation
"You're Getting a Little Too Smart" by Detroit Emeralds
Dope Rhymes
"Cut the Cake" by Average White Band
Ride the Rhythm
"Hard Times" by Baby Huey
"Baby Let Me Kiss You" by King Floyd
Make It
"Music Is the Key (House Key)" by J.M. Silk
Let the Words Flow
"Voices Inside My Head" by The Police
"Funky Drummer" by James Brown
Let Me Show You
"N.T." by Kool & the Gang
"The Boss" by James Brown
Wild Pitch (KDAY Remix)
"Books and Basketball (Montage)" by Billy Preston & Syreeta
"Gimmie What You Got" by Le Pamplemousse
Let Me Show You (Remix)
Dance, Dance, Dance by Claudja Barry & Ronnie Jones
"N.T." by Kool & the Gang
"One Man Band (Plays All Alone)" by Monk Higgins & the Specialties

Instrumental credits
Bass Guitar - Les July
Saxophone - Jack Bashkow
Flute - Jack Bashkow
Scratches - Crazy O

Album chart positions

References

1989 debut albums
Wild Pitch Records albums
Albums produced by the 45 King
Albums produced by Prince Paul (producer)